The Foliage, also known as Years Without Epidemic, is a 2003 Chinese romance film directed by Lü Yue and stars Liu Ye, Shu Qi, Fang Bin, and Qi Huan. The film is an adaptation of Chinese-American writer Frank Shi's novel My First Love. It tells the love story of sent-down youth Liu Simeng and Ye Xingyu. The film premiered in China in 2003.

Plot

On her way back from a family visit, young female intellectual Xing-Yu (Shu Qi) meets the equally young and rebellious Si-Mong (Liu Hua) and the two fall in love. When Xing-Yu's childhood friend and lover Yuan gets into a fight with Si-Mong, Xing-Yu tries to make peace between the two jealous rivals. Her attempts for truce further draw her into a forbidden and passionate relationship instead.

Cast
 Liu Ye as Liu Simeng, a sent-down youth who falls in love with Ye Xingyu.
 Shu Qi as Ye Xingyu, Yuan Dingguo's girlfriend, when she meet Liu Simeng, they fall in love. She is in a love triangle with Yuan Dingguo and Liu Simeng.
 Fang Bin as Yuan Dingguo, Ye Xingyu's boyfriend.
 Qi Huan as Wei Hong
 Li Mengnan as Manager Wu
 Zhang Jing as Lian Yun
 Li Chengyuan as the Company Commander
 Liu Yiwei as Master Cui
 Chen Chuang as Lin Shan
 He Yunqing as Supply Chief
 Fu Xiaoyuan as the Political Instructor
 Xi Yang as Shaman
 He Qichao as Goupi (child)
 Cui Jun as Goupi (grown)
 Zhang Shimin as Yuan Xiaoyu (child)
 Li Lucen as Yuan Xiaoyu (grown)
 Zhu Kaige as the Library Curator
 Yao Jianyun as the Bus Driver
 Deng Wei as the Posseman
 Lei Yongda as the Posseman
 Hu Yousheng as Manager Hu

Production
Lü Yue, an Oscar Prize nominee, The Foliage was his second film since he is a photographer turned director.

This film was shot in Honghe Hani and Yi Autonomous Prefecture, Yunnan.

Shu Qi plays a village girl in a love triangle with Liu Ye and Fang Bin's characters.

Principal photography started in July 2003 and wrapped in September 2003.

Accolades

References

External links
 
 

Chinese romantic drama films
Films shot in Yunnan
Films set in Yunnan
2003 romantic drama films
2003 films
Films based on Chinese novels
Films directed by Lu Yue